Interview is a 1973 Indian Malayalam film, directed by J. Sasikumar and produced by Thiruppathi Chettiyar. The film stars Prem Nazir, Jayabharathi, Kaviyoor Ponnamma and Adoor Bhasi in the lead roles. The film had musical score by V. Dakshinamoorthy.

Cast
Prem Nazir as Vijayan
Jayabharathi as Susheela 
Kaviyoor Ponnamma as Saraswathi
Adoor Bhasi as Velu Pilla
Sankaradi as Govinda Pilla
Sreelatha Namboothiri as Ambika
Bahadoor as Kuttappan
Sujatha as Sreedevi
T. R. Omana as Shankari
T. S. Muthaiah as Keshava Pilla
Muthukulam Raghava Pilla as Sekhara Pilla
Pala Thankam as Susheela's mother
Thodupuzha Radhakrishnan as Balakrishnan
P. R. Menon as Panchayath President
Mookkannoor Sebastian
Hema
Sathi
Jose 
Hari
Latha Raju
C. I. Balan

Soundtrack
The music was composed by V. Dakshinamoorthy and the lyrics were written by Vayalar Ramavarma.

References

External links
 

1973 films
1970s Malayalam-language films
Films directed by J. Sasikumar